HNLMS Zeeland is the second ship of the s of the Royal Netherlands Navy. The ship entered service on 29 November 2013 and is named after the Dutch province of Zeeland.

Design
The ship was originally designed to fulfill patrol and intervention tasks against lightly armed opponents, such as pirates and smugglers. However, she also has very advanced electronic and radar surveillance capabilities which are used for military stabilisation and security roles, short of outright war. Without sonar or long range weapons, it utilizes the surveillance capabilities of the Thales integrated mast, which integrates communication systems and two 4-faced phased arrays for air and surface search.

Integrated mast module
The integrated mast module (IMM) has been built to an innovative concept. The mast houses all systems which form the "eyes and ears" of the ship. The ship can efficiently detect pirate and smuggling boats while keeping an eye on the skies as well.
For the first time camera, radar and communications antenna systems are merged into one mast structure. This allows the ship to see flying and floating objects. The means of communication in the mast making it possible to carry out worldwide operations in conjunction with aircraft and ships.

Service history
On 6 February 2014, Zeeland rescued seven of the eleven passengers of an overturned boat while it was on its way to the Dutch Caribbean to fulfill patrol duties. Three of the eleven passengers died before Zeeland spotted the boat, one of the passengers was missing.

Zeeland and Pelikaan had an important role in the emergency assistance to Sint Maarten, St Eustatius and Saba after hurricane Irma had hit the island in September 2017.

Fire
Around 01:30 on the night of 4 July 2022 a fire broke out in an electrical room while under going maintenance in drydock at de Nieuwe Haven Naval Base. The fire was extinguished after burning for one and a half hours. No one was injured. An investigation into the cause and damage will be carried out in the near future.  The ship suffered significant damage.

See also
 HNLMS Holland (P840)
 HNLMS Friesland (P842)
 HNLMS Groningen (P843)

References

Holland-class offshore patrol vessels
Ships built in Vlissingen
2010 ships
Patrol vessels of the Royal Netherlands Navy